State elections were held in South Australia on 5 April 1930. All 46 seats in the South Australian House of Assembly were up for election. The incumbent Liberal Federation government led by Premier of South Australia Richard L. Butler was defeated by the opposition Australian Labor Party led by Leader of the Opposition Lionel Hill.

Each district elected multiple members. This election saw the change from first past the post (plurality) to instant-runoff (preferential) voting, which also meant that electors cast a single vote rather than multiple votes. With 30 of 46 seats in the House of Assembly, the election remains South Australian Labor's biggest seat win.

Results

|}

See also
Results of the South Australian state election, 1930 (House of Assembly)
Candidates of the South Australian state election, 1930
Members of the South Australian House of Assembly, 1930–1933
Members of the South Australian Legislative Council, 1930–1933

References
History of South Australian elections 1857-2006, volume 1: ECSA
State and federal election results  in Australia since 1890

Specific

Elections in South Australia
1930 elections in Australia
1930s in South Australia
April 1930 events